William Benedict Nicholson, OBE, FRSL (born 12 January 1948) is a British screenwriter, playwright, and novelist who has been nominated twice for an Oscar.

Early life
A native of Lewes, Sussex, William Nicholson was raised in a Roman Catholic family in Gloucestershire. By the time he reached his tenth birthday he had decided to become a writer. He was educated at Downside School, Somerset, and Christ's College, Cambridge.

Career
At the start of his career Nicholson worked for the BBC as a director of documentary films with numerous works to his credit between the mid-1970s and mid-1980s. He gained renown as a novelist and playwright when the first book of his popular Wind On Fire trilogy won the Blue Peter best book award and the Smarties Gold Award for Best Children's Book. He has written several novels and fantasy books.

He married author Virginia Nicholson (née Bell) in 1988.

Screenplays and theatre
He has twice been nominated for Tony Awards for best play, for Shadowlands and The Retreat from Moscow. He also turned Shadowlands, based on the relationship between C. S. Lewis and Joy Gresham, into a BBC-TV play in 1985, and an acclaimed film in 1993. The latter starred Anthony Hopkins and Debra Winger and was directed by Richard Attenborough. Following screenplays included Nell (1994), First Knight (1995) and Grey Owl (1999). He later worked as a writer on the Academy Award winning epic Gladiator (2000), which had a very difficult production, and made his directorial debut with the 1997 film Firelight.

In 2007, Nicholson co-wrote Elizabeth: The Golden Age, from an earlier script by Michael Hirst. In 2012, Nicholson adapted the hit musical Les Misérables into a film directed by Tom Hooper. Following this, Nicholson would write several more historical dramas, such as Unbroken, Everest and Breathe. He directed another film, Hope Gap, in 2019.

Awards, nominations and honours
William Nicholson's first nomination came in 1989 when BAFTA TV Awards included the 1987 teleplay Sweet as You Are, which he co-wrote with Ruth Caleb and Angela Pope, on its list of candidates for Best Single Drama. His next nominations were for 1994's Shadowlands, when he was a contender for both a BAFTA and an Oscar for Best Adapted Screenplay. 1997 was another successful year, with an Outstanding Writing for a Miniseries or a Special Emmy nomination for the 1996 TV drama Crime of the Century. He was also singled out at the San Sebastian International Film Festival for Firelight, with a nomination for the Golden Seashell Award and a win of the Special Prize of the Jury.

2000 turned out to be Nicholson's most impressive year to date, with acclaim for the Best Picture Oscar winner Gladiator. He had nominations for the Sierra Award from the Las Vegas Film Critics Society Awards and the Saturn Award from the Academy of Science Fiction, Fantasy & Horror Films, followed by Best Screenplay nominations from both BAFTA and Oscar.

He was appointed Officer of the Order of the British Empire (OBE) in the 2015 New Year Honours for services to drama and literature.

Books

Fantasy novels
 Wind On Fire trilogy 
The Wind Singer
 Slaves of the Mastery
 Firesong
 Noble Warriors Trilogy
 Seeker (UK release 2005)
 Jango (UK release 2006)
 Noman (UK release 2007)

Novels
The Seventh Level, A Sexual Progress (1979)

Why is this happening 
The Society of Others (UK release 2004)
The Trial of True Love (UK release 2005)
The Secret Intensity of Everyday Life (UK release 2009)
Rich and Mad (UK release 2010)
All The Hopeful Lovers (UK release 2010)
Motherland (UK release 2013)
Reckless (UK release 2014)
The Lovers of Amherst (UK release 2015)
Adventures in Modern Marriage (UK release 2022

Stage plays
 Shadowlands (1989) - Writer
 The Retreat from Moscow (1989) - Writer

Filmography

References

External links

 Official website

Fansite

 

1948 births
Living people
20th-century English dramatists and playwrights
21st-century English novelists
21st-century British short story writers
21st-century British screenwriters
21st-century English male writers
English film directors
English children's writers
English screenwriters
English male screenwriters
English fantasy writers
People from Royal Tunbridge Wells
People educated at Downside School
Alumni of Christ's College, Cambridge
Fellows of the Royal Society of Literature
British writers of young adult literature
People from Lewes
Officers of the Order of the British Empire
English male dramatists and playwrights
English male short story writers
English short story writers
English male novelists